Zinaida Irutė Dargienė (born 1936 Mažeikiai, Lithuania) is a Lithuanian textile artist.

Training
Dargienė attended the Vilnius Academy of Arts (Kaunas Textile Arts Department), graduating in 1965. In 1997 she did an internship at the Shankar School of Arts, Israel.

References

1936 births
Living people
Lithuanian painters
20th-century Lithuanian women artists
21st-century Lithuanian women artists
People from Mažeikiai
Vilnius Academy of Arts alumni